Two Children Teasing a Cat is a 1587-1588 oil on canvas painting by Annibale Carracci, now in the Metropolitan Museum of Art in New York, which acquired it in 1994.

Previously attributed to Agostino Carracci, Roberto Longhi gave it its present attribution, now largely accepted. No documents survive on its commissioning and so its dating is purely on stylistic grounds. This places it in the artist's relative youth, when he was still producing several genre works. The influence of Tintoretto and other Venetian artists is clear, placing it at the end of the 1580s, at which time the artist is known to have been staying in Venice.

Analysis

References

1588 paintings
Paintings by Annibale Carracci
Paintings in the collection of the Metropolitan Museum of Art
Paintings of children
Genre paintings
Animal paintings
Cats in art
Oil on canvas paintings